The Sørsund Bridge is a bridge that crosses the Sørsundet strait between the islands of Kirkelandet and Innlandet in the town of Kristiansund which is in Kristiansund Municipality, Møre og Romsdal county, Norway. The bridge opened in 1963 and it carries County Road 420.

See also
List of bridges in Norway
List of bridges in Norway by length
List of bridges
List of bridges by length
Nordsund Bridge

References

External links
A picture of Sørsund Bridge
A picture of Kristiansund with both Sørsund (left) and Nordsund (right) bridges

Bridges in Møre og Romsdal
Bridges completed in 1963
Kristiansund